The Bear Pond Mountains are a sub-range in the Appalachian Mountains, that straddle Pennsylvania and Maryland in the United States.  These mountains are a part of the Ridge and Valley Appalachians and reach their highest point at Cross Mountain (Pennsylvania) . A unique geologic feature known as the "Punchbowl" occurs in this range. This feature was created by the weathered shales of the Ordovician age in the center of a south-plunging anticline, having been eroded to expose a large amphitheater-like feature (punchbowl). Cross and Hearthstone Mountain are made of hard resistant quartzite of the Tuscarora Formation of the Silurian age, which form the walls of the bowl.

Whitetail Ski Resort is also located in this range on Two Top Mountain.

The chief summits of the Bear Pond Mountains are the following:

Cross Mountain (Pennsylvania) 
Hearthstone Mountain 
Two Top Mountain 
Mount Mollica 1,776 feet (541 m)
Mount Fallon 1,764 feet (537 m)
Kasie's Knob 
Fairview Mountain 
Gillian's Knob 
Bullskin Mountain 
Rickard Mountain 
Powell Mountain 
Sword Mountain 
Abe Mills Mountain 
Johnson Mountain

References
Alan R. Geyer (1979) "Outstanding Geologic Features of Pennsylvania", Geological Survey of Pennsylvania

 

Mountain ranges of Pennsylvania
Mountain ranges of Maryland
Landforms of Washington County, Maryland
Landforms of Franklin County, Pennsylvania